Creepypastas are horror-related legends or images that have been copied and pasted around the Internet. These Internet entries are often brief, user-generated, paranormal stories intended to scare, frighten, or discomfort readers. The term "creepypasta" originates from "copypasta", a portmanteau of the words "copy" and "paste".

List of creepypastas

1999
1999 is a creepypasta that started as a blog by Camden Lamont which was updated in real-time. It tells the story of a Canadian man named Elliot, who is investigating a mysterious public access channel called Caledon Local 21. The mascot of the channel is "Mr. Bear", the star of the series Mr. Bear's Cellar. Elliot remembers writing to Mr. Bear when he was younger, and during the investigation, he finds a police station with several Mr. Bear tapes, including an episode where Mr. Bear murders several children. In one of the last updates, Camden says he was contacted by an email address that supposedly belongs to Mr. Bear. The blog ends on a cliffhanger after Camden mentions the email address.

Abandoned by Disney
Abandoned by Disney is a creepypasta written by Slimebeast about a man exploring an abandoned Disney resort, named Mowgli's Palace. The story's climax comes when the man finds a room marked "CHARACTER PREP 1" which is inhabited by a photo-negative Mickey Mouse mascot that seems to be alive and flees when he witnesses it rip off its own head.

The Ayuwoki
The Ayuwoki began as a YouTube video created in 2009 by fiction writer Thomas Rengstorff, to promote an animatronic robot with a mask resembling a distorted likeness of the late Michael Jackson. In early 2019 it morphed into a meme, a challenge, and an urban legend that also spawned a video game; it caused several authorities to calm any fears regarding the meme's influence. The Ayuwoki gets its name from a Spanish misspelling of the lyrics "Annie, are you okay?" from the song "Smooth Criminal".

The Backrooms

The Backrooms is a short passage originally posted to 4chan's /x/ board in 2019 as a caption to a photograph of a hallway with yellow carpets and wallpaper. The story purports that by "noclipping out of bounds in real life", one may enter a realm known as the Backrooms, an empty wasteland of corridors and rooms with nothing but "the stink of old moist carpet, the madness of mono-yellow, the endless background noise of fluorescent lights at maximum hum-buzz, and approximately six hundred million square miles of randomly segmented empty rooms to be trapped in", as well as malevolent entities that hunt the traveler across three separate areas of the Backrooms, "Levels 0 through 2". Over time, The Backrooms has been successively expanded into a mythos, with online writers adding information on new levels, entities, items, and phenomena within the Backrooms.

The location in the original photograph which spawned the Backrooms story is still unidentified as of 2023. Backrooms images are an example of liminal spaces.

On January 7, 2022, YouTuber and VFX artist Kane Pixels uploaded a short analog horror film The Backrooms (Found Footage), which follows a cameraman who records his experience in The Backrooms after he noclips in. Since then, it has garnered acclaim from the viewers, with over 46 million views as of March 14. Since the original upload, Kane has expanded upon his take on the Backrooms lore with more videos.

The Expressionless
The Expressionless is a story that was added to the Creepypasta Tumblr in June 2012. The story is set in June 1972, where a woman appeared in Cedars-Sinai Medical Center wearing only a gown drenched in blood. The woman had a mannequin-like face and a kitten clamped in her jaw. She pulled the animal out and threw it aside, and then collapsed. The doctors decided that sedating her would be the best option. After attempting to sedate her, the woman rose from the bed. The staff attempted to restrain her, but it did not stop her from brutally massacring and cannibalizing the entirety of the present personnel using her sharp teeth. One female doctor survived and nicknamed her "The Expressionless".

Hi I'm Mary Mary
Hi I'm Mary Mary (often stylized as hiimmarymary) is a story told through multiple YouTube videos, starting in July 9, 2016. The story follows Mary, a woman who one day woke up in a house similar to her grandparents' home, however, nobody else is there and nothing can be done to escape. Mary decides to record her experiences in the house, and eventually the garden, to keep herself occupied. During the day, the house is mostly normal and calm. However, during the night, strange and demonic figures representative of mental illnesses appear to torment her.

Jeff the Killer

Jeff the Killer is a story accompanied by an image of the title character. In the most notable version of the Jeff the Killer story which originated in 2011, a teenager named Jeffrey Woods is attacked by a group of bullies. The fight ends with Jeff being nearly arrested for assault, which his brother Liu takes the blame for, getting taken away. This resulted in Jeff becoming depressed and introverted. His concerned parents force him to go to a party, where he gets approached by the same bullies he got in a fight with before. There, the bullies doused him with alcohol and set him on fire. After being discharged from the hospital and having his bandages removed, Jeff becomes insane, carving his own face to leave a smile-shaped scar, burning off his eyelids, and killing his family. He becomes a serial killer who sneaks into houses at night and whispers "go to sleep" to his victims before killing them. The story quickly became one of the most popular creepypastas and would inspire many other stories, including Jane the Killer. The character of Jeff was created by DeviantArt user "sesseur", the pseudonym of Jeff Case of Auburndale, Florida. The story above was not made by sesseur himself, but rather "a fan of his earlier work". Sesseur began posting about Jeff on Newgrounds in 2008 under the alias "killerjeff", describing a Bloody Mary-like ritual which supposedly can be performed to summon Jeff. According to the original story, Jeff "accidentally spilled a bucket of acid on his face while trying to clean his bathtub". A 2013 article asserted that the original image of Jeff the Killer was an extensively edited picture of a girl who committed suicide in the fall of 2008 due to people online ridiculing her appearance. However, in 2018, after extensive research done by the users of 4chan's /x/ (Paranormal) board, this rumor was debunked; the earliest known instances of the image that was used in the creepypasta appearing online at the time had been found on the Japanese imageboard website pya.cc, dating back to September and November 2005. In 2022, an even earlier instance of the image was found dating back to July 2005 on the Japanese image sharing site fileman.ne1.jp.

Mereana Mordegard Glesgorv
Mereana Mordegard Glesgorv is the title of a twenty-second-long video uploaded to YouTube in 2008 by a user called erwilzei. It depicts footage with a red filter, of a man silently staring into the camera. A slightly longer version was later produced, depicting the man suddenly smirking towards the end; this was accompanied with a short story which claimed that several viewers who saw the footage in its entirety, which ran for approximately two minutes, were driven insane by what they saw, cutting out their eyes and mailing them to YouTube's headquarters. The man seen in the video was later identified as Byron Cortez, a citizen of the United States Virgin Islands.

Penpal
Penpal is a six-part creepypasta novel by Dathan Auerbach. The original stories were published on Reddit, and were collected as a self-published paperback in 2012.

The Rake 

The Rake is a strange humanoid creature described as resembling either a naked man or a large hairless dog whose sightings have been reported on four different continents, occasionally being referred to as a "Skin-Walker", with the earliest known account being a mariner's log in 1691. Named for its massive, incredibly sharp claws, the Rake lacerates its victims in their sleep and in some cases, whispers to them in a frightening voice. Those fortunate enough to survive an encounter with the Rake usually end up traumatized by its appearance and behavior.

The Rake is often listed as one of the most famous Creepypasta monsters. In 2018, a film based on the Rake was released on TubiTV and Amazon Prime. The film was poorly received by critics.

The Russian Sleep Experiment

The Russian Sleep Experiment tells of Soviet agents and scientists experimenting on both political prisoners and prisoners of war during World War II, in which the prisoners are kept in a sealed-off room which was filled with an experimental gas to prevent sleep. This mysterious gas turns the prisoners into violent zombie-like monsters. In the end, the commander demands a researcher to enter the room and start killing the prisoners, with one of them uttering "So nearly free" or "Finally put to rest" before they die.

Siren Head

Siren Head is a fictional monster created by Trevor Henderson. It is a tall emaciated being with a pair of symbolic sirens where a head would normally go, which are capable of emitting various noises both natural and man-made, including sirens, radio broadcasts, white noise, and human voices. An ambush predator, it always hides in plain sight and sometimes mimics the voices of its past victims to lure any potential prey closer. The creature is one of many monsters in Trevor Henderson's found-footage style art including Cartoon Cat, Bridge Worm, Long Horse, Cartoon dog, and more, and has been the subject of multiple video games, the most popular being a short horror game independently developed by Modus Interactive with the permission of Henderson. The game was originally created in 2018 for a PlayStation-themed Game Jam, and gained an increase in popularity in 2020 after being showcased by various big gaming YouTubers and streamers, including PewDiePie, Markiplier, and Jacksepticeye. Siren Head was also included in a popular Fallout 4 mod, called Whispering Hills. Another game, titled Sirenhead, was developed by UndreamedPanic and praised for its visuals and sound design.

Slender Man

Slender Man is a lanky humanoid with no distinguishable facial features, who wears a trademark black suit. The character originated in a 2009 Something Awful Photoshop competition, before later being featured as a main antagonist in the Marble Hornets alternate reality game. According to most stories, he targets younger people who supposedly go into his forest looking for him. The legend also caused controversy with the Slender Man stabbing in 2014. The character is featured in various films, television series and video games and is fondly remembered as one of the most iconic Internet urban legends of the 2010s.

Ted the Caver

Ted the Caver began as an Angelfire website in early 2001 that documented the adventures of a man and his friends as they explored a local cave. The story is in the format of a series of blog posts. As the explorers move further into the cave, strange hieroglyphs and winds are encountered. In a final blog post, Ted writes that he and his companions will be bringing a gun into the cave after experiencing a series of nightmares and hallucinations. The blog has not been updated since the final post. In 2013, an independent film adaptation of the story was released, called Living Dark: The Story of Ted the Caver.

Torture Soup (Blank Room Soup)
Torture Soup or Blank Room Soup is a video in which a man is seen reluctantly eating a bowl of soup with a large spoon. Midway through the video, the man begins sobbing uncontrollably while two masked people caress his head and back. There are several theories about the clip, one of them affirms that the man who appears in the video had to endure four days of starvation, and then he was forced to eat the remains of his deceased wife and children.

The video was uploaded to YouTube under the headlines "Blank Room Soup" and "Torture Soup", and quickly became popular. The costumes used in the video are costumes of characters known as RayRay, created by Raymond Persi; the characters were originally devised in 2002 when Persi began to draw these characters based on his vision of himself. There are many claims that the video was not created by Persi, and that the costumes featured in the video were stolen after a live show, and that the video was later released to him.

Zalgo

Zalgo is a recurring creepypasta character who is alternately interpreted as a deity, an abstract supernatural force, or a secret collective. The concept originated in 2004 on the Something Awful forums, with edits of cartoons to depict characters mutating and bleeding from their eyes while praising Zalgo. The depictions were coupled with a unique form of distorted text that became known as Zalgo text.

Lost episode creepypastas
Lost episode is a common subgenre of creepypasta and revolves around lost episodes of various media properties. These lost episodes are usually explained as having been prevented from airing, or pulled during broadcast due to controversial, mature, or unsettling aspects being shown, such as graphic violence, gore, and adult themes.

Candle Cove

Candle Cove is a 2009 story by Kris Straub written in the format of an online forum thread in which people reminisce about a half-remembered children's television series from the 1970s involving a young girl - the series' protagonist - going on adventures with a cast of pirates. The posters share memories of the puppets used in the series, and discuss nightmares that they experienced after watching certain episodes (such as those involving a villain called the Skin-Taker, and one that had no dialogue and involved the puppets screaming relentlessly while the protagonist was reduced to hysterical crying). One poster then asks their mother about the series and is told that the mother just used to tune the television to static, which the child would watch for thirty minutes.

Syfy announced a television drama based on the story in 2015, adapted by Nick Antosca and Max Landis. The story makes up the first season of Channel Zero, which premiered on October 11, 2016.

Dead Bart (7G06)
Dead Bart is a story by writer K. I. Simpson. It features the Simpson family going on a plane trip together, but while being his usual, mischievous self, Bart ends up breaking a window on the plane and getting sucked out, falling to his death. After an apparently very realistic view of his corpse, the show's second act features a surreal take on the Simpson family's grief. Act three opens with a title card saying one year has passed. Homer, Marge, and Lisa are skeletally thin, and still sitting at the table. There is no sign of Maggie or the pets. They decide to visit Bart's grave. Springfield is completely deserted, and as they walk to the cemetery the houses become more and more decrepit. Emotionally abandoned, they arrive at Bart's grave where Bart's body is simply lying in front of his tombstone, appearing similar to the corpse in act one. The family starts crying again, but eventually, they stop and blankly stare at Bart's body. Near the end, the camera starts to zoom into Homer's face and according to summaries, Homer also tells a joke during this part. In a later update, it is revealed that Homer is saying "If only we were all that lucky." The episode ends with a zoom-out of the cemetery, featuring the names of every single Simpsons guest star on the tombstones, with the ones that have not died yet all having the same death date.

Squidward's Suicide (Red Mist)
The full story is told from the perspective of a person who interned at Nickelodeon Studios in 2005 as an animation student. The student and some other coworkers received a tape to edit titled "Squidward’s Suicide" for the series SpongeBob SquarePants. The staff initially assumed it was just an office prank. In the firsthand account, the video consists of Squidward preparing for a concert. After Squidward finishes playing at the concert, the crowd jeers at Squidward. The next shows Squidward forlornly sitting on a bed, while strange and upsetting noises play and become louder in the background. The scene is spliced with quick flashes of murdered children, each time the noises getting louder when cutting back to Squidward—now bearing red 'hyper realistic' eyes. Eventually, Squidward shoots himself after a detached, deep voice commands him to do so, and the video ends.

The circulated image of red-eyed Squidward associated with this creepypasta was referenced in the series and included in the original uncut airing of the season 12 episode "SpongeBob in RandomLand". According to Vincent Waller (the showrunner and co-executive producer of season 12), the purpose of the reference was to make fun of "try-hard edgy fanfiction", and he has referred to "Squidward's Suicide" as a "ridiculous fanfiction". He further clarified that it was only intended as a reference and that the "Red Mist Squidward" character is "FAR from canon".

Suicidemouse.avi

Suicidemouse.avi is a nine-minute Mickey Mouse video uploaded to YouTube in 2009, with the video posing as being forgotten Mickey Mouse footage made by Walt Disney himself during the 1920s golden age of American animation. The "forbidden" cartoon begins with a 3-minute animation loop of Mickey walking down a street with a dull, almost depressed look on his face. All the while, the sound of a piano being played poorly can be heard in the background. After the 6-minute mark, the video cuts to black as the sound of TV white noise replaces the original banging piano music. The video then cuts back to Mickey, who starts sneering after a while, and the sound of a garbled cry can be heard. It is at the 8-minute mark that the audio changes once again, this time to a woman screaming in agony, and as the screams get louder and louder, the picture changes; the streets and sidewalks Mickey is walking on start to travel in impossible directions, while the buildings look destroyed. Mickey's face begins to fall apart as his eyeballs roll to the bottom of his chin like marbles in a fishbowl and disappear, his smile creeps up to the left side of his head, and eventually he ends up looking demented. The screaming continues until the 9-minute mark when the episode ends, while the original story and footage of Mickey ends there, one interpretation shows a scene with Mickey spinning and then falling to the ground, dying, and a demon appears, making a loud screeching noise, before disappearing. An image of Mickey's head appears on the screen (similarly to the ending of classical Mickey Mouse cartoons around the time) for approximately 30 seconds, while what sounds like a broken music box plays in the background, with a Russian text that roughly reads: "The sights of Hell bring its viewers back in". The remaining 30 seconds is supposedly unknown to the public, though it is suggested that whatever took place during those last 30 seconds was so mentally traumatic, that it resulted in the employee who first screened the episode committing suicide after watching it and uttering the phrase "Real suffering is not known."

This creepypasta was adapted into a movie on June 15, 2018, directed by Christo Lopez. The budget was over $5,000 and it was filmed in the United States.

The Wyoming Incident
The Wyoming Incident is the case of an alleged interruption of the transmission in Niobrara County, Wyoming in 2006. During the interruption, viewers saw disembodied human heads performing various poses and emotions. The story goes that those who watched for a prolonged period of time presented everything from vomiting, hallucinations, and headaches. These physical ailments are believed to have been caused by the high-pitched noise that played throughout most of the video. The hacker who allegedly did this was never found. As a tribute to the story, a video game developed using the Raycasting Game Maker program was released in 2010 and later was updated in 2018.

Fanfictions
While the following stories do not fit the typical definition of creepypastas – often being written from an in-universe perspective, they are sometimes associated with the genre:

Rainbow Factory
Created by internet user Aurora Dawn, Rainbow Factory is another fanfiction of My Little Pony: Friendship is Magic. It tells the story of two Pegasi, Scootaloo and Orion, who fail a flight test due to trying to help a third Pegasus, Aurora, who broke their wing while flying. They are transferred to a large weather factory that is managed by Rainbow Dash. After being locked in a large room with several others, Rainbow Dash reveals how rainbows are made through the use of mutilated, live Pegasi being put through a machine called a Pegasus Device that converts their corpses into individual colors (known as Spectra), which are then mixed to make rainbows. After attempting to retaliate against Rainbow Dash and the cruelty in the factory, Orion is chained up to the machine and is twisted until his ribs shatter, before being tossed in the Device. Scootaloo attempts to escape from a now-maniacal and insane Rainbow Dash, but is proven fruitless as she is captured by guards and attached to the machine, where she utters her last words to Rainbow Dash: "You have beautiful eyes." The ending of the story is ambiguous as to her fate. There is a sequel to this set twenty years later, centered around two other foals who escape being turned into rainbows, and the lives of the workers in the weather factory.

Video game creepypastas
These creepypasta focus on video games containing grotesque or violent content; this content may spill over into the real world and cause the player to harm themselves or others. Many video game creepypastas involve malevolent entities such as ghosts or artificial intelligence.

BEN Drowned

Created by Internet user Alex Hall (a.k.a. "Jadusable"), Ben Drowned tells a story of a college student only identified as Jadusable who buys a used copy of the video game The Legend of Zelda: Majora's Mask from an elderly man at a yard sale. Jadusable finds that the cartridge is haunted by the ghost of a boy named Ben, who drowned, as well as an entity that seems to have taken his name only identified as BEN, and an enigmatic force known as the Father. After performing the Fourth Day Glitch, Jadusable encounters disturbing glitches and ominous messages such as "You shouldn't have done that ..." and "You've met with a terrible fate, haven't you?", and begins to encounter Ben in the game, who takes the form of the Elegy of Emptiness statue. The story would later spiral into an Alternate Reality Game with the introduction of an in-universe website belonging to the Moon Children, a mysterious cult. After an eight-year-long hiatus, the story returned in 2020, once again in the Alternate Reality Game format, for its final arc, dubbed "Awakening", which featured adjacent plotlines about a man calling himself Jadus recounting his experiences during a societal collapse due to a virus known as H.E.R.O.E.S, people waking up in a mysterious hotel run by a man named Abel, and a return to the haunted Majora's Mask cartridge.

Catastrophe Crow!
Catastrophe Crow!, also known as Crow 64, is a creepypasta revolving around a fictional 3D platform game for the Nintendo 64 developed in Germany that was never released, whose developer, Manfred Lorenz, supposedly disappeared at sea. The story of the video game was first released when a video produced by YouTuber Adam Butcher was released, titled "What Happened to Crow 64?".

GAMEBOY ADVANCE SP BLUE EDITION CREEPYPASTA
GAMEBOY ADVANCE SP BLUE EDITION CREEPYPASTA, is a parody of video game creepypastas written and narrated by YouTuber Chris "Oney" O'Neill. O'Neill uses recurring tropes from the creepypasta genre with the addition of redundant and absurdist details, including verbal descriptions of elements used in visual media such as thought bubbles and Gaussian blurs. The original story was posted on O'Neil's YouTube gaming channel OneyPlays in November 2017, with a song adaptation of the creepypasta made by the fellow YouTube channel The Living Tombstone uploaded December 2017.

The story is a man's retelling of an experience "53 years ago, back when [he] was a fully grown little boy" wherein a car "clobbered" him through a window and into the bedroom of a little boy playing with a GameBoy Advance SP. The protagonist steals the GameBoy for himself and plays on it Super Mario and the Legend of the Stolen GameBoy Advance SP Blue Edition until the Mario in the game curses the protagonist for stealing him. Hoping to lift Mario's curse, the protagonist returns to the boy's bedroom to and give back the GameBoy, only to find the boy's family there lowering the coffin of the boy (who had died over the loss of his GameBoy) into a grave. After falling into the grave and returning the GameBody to the dead child, Mario lifts the curse and returns the protagonist home unharmed. Having learned his lesson about stealing, the protagonist declares everything would be alright even though "the child remained permanently dead".

Herobrine

Originally posted by an anonymous user on 4chan, Herobrine is a supernatural being or ghost that haunts single-player worlds of the sandbox video game Minecraft. The character is supposed to look like Steve, one of the default character skins available for new players of Minecraft, except for a pair of glowing white eyes which lack pupils. Theories which explain the Herobrine's supposed origins range from his purported identity as the supposedly deceased brother of Minecraft creator Markus Persson, to an "unlucky miner" who haunt living players out of a desire for vengeance.

Lavender Town Syndrome

This legend purports that, shortly after the original Japanese release of the video games Pokémon Red and Green in 1996, there was an increase in the death rate amongst children aged 10–15. Children who had played the games reportedly screamed in terror at the sight of either of the games inserted into the Game Boy handheld console, and exhibited other erratic behavior, before committing suicide through methods such as hanging, jumping from heights, and creatively severe self-mutilation. Supposedly, the suicides were connected to the eerie background music played in the fictional location of Lavender Town in the games. In the game's canon, Lavender Town is the site of the haunted Pokémon Tower, where numerous graves of Pokémon can be found.

The legend alleges that children, besides being the primary players of the games, are more susceptible to the effects of the Lavender Town music, because it supposedly incorporates binaural beats and a high-pitched tone that adults cannot hear. It has been speculated that the legend was inspired by an actual event in Japan in 1997, in which hundreds of television viewers experienced seizures due to a scene with flickering images in an episode of the Pokémon anime, titled "Dennō Senshi Porygon".

NES Godzilla Creepypasta
NES Godzilla Creepypasta is a story written by Cosbydaf, who also produced the sprite artwork for the story. It relates the tale of a character named Zach who plays an unusual copy of the Nintendo Entertainment System game Godzilla: Monster of Monsters!. As Zach progresses through the game, simple glitches begin to turn into entirely new content and new monsters - including members of Toho’s monsters that never appeared in the game and monsters from entries in the Godzilla franchise that were released after Monster of Monsters!, and wholly-original creatures unrelated to either of the prior two categories - and eventually, a malevolent, supernatural being by the name of Red reveals himself. As the mystery behind the nature of Red unravels, it is revealed that the demon has closer ties to Zach than he ever could have expected. The story concludes with Zach - having defeated Red during the final battle - selling the game on eBay, unable to bring himself to keep or destroy the mysterious cartridge.

The story is often praised for its extensive use of custom-made screenshots, depicting thousands of sprites created by the story's author. A fangame based on the story is being developed; a demo was released in 2017.

Petscop

Petscop is a web series released on YouTube which purports to be a Let's Play of a "lost and unfinished" 1997 PlayStation video game of the same name. In the game, the player character must capture strange creatures known as "pets" by solving puzzles. However, after the narrator of the series enters a code on a note attached to the copy of the game he received, he can enter a strange, dark, and hidden section of the game: the Newmaker Plane and the depths below it. Although the puzzles continue, the game's tone shifts dramatically, and numerous references to child abuse appear; Newmaker appears to refer to the real-life case of Candace Newmaker, who was murdered during rebirthing therapy.

Polybius

An urban legend claims that in 1981, an arcade cabinet called Polybius caused nightmares and hallucinations in players, leading at least one person to suicide. Several people supposedly became anti-gaming activists, after playing Polybius. One of the oldest urban legends regarding video games, Polybius has entered popular culture, and numerous fangames exist as attempts to recreate the game from numerous accounts of its nature.

Pale Luna
Pale Luna is a creepypasta which tells the story of a text-based adventure game, named "Pale Luna". Never distributed outside the San Francisco Bay Area, the game starts with some text that states: "You are in a dark room. Moonlight comes through the window. There is GOLD in a corner, along with a SHOVEL and a ROPE. There is a DOOR to the WEST. Command?". After the player completes level 1, the next level displays text that says: "Reap your reward. PALE LUNA SMILES AT YOU. You are in a forest, there are paths to the NORTH, EAST, and WEST. Commands?".

Most players describe the game as a joke in bad taste and extremely lazy programming, as well as broken and unplayable. However, a player named Michael Nevins plays a copy to see if there is something beyond; after five hours of play and several reboots, the game displays the following text: "PALE LUNA SMILES WIDE. There are no paths. PALE LUNA SMILES WIDE. The ground is soft. PALE LUNA SMILES WIDE. Here. Command?". After Nevins chooses a series of commands: "Dig hole. Throw gold. Fill hole," the game shows the following text: "Congratulations, 40.24248 -121.4434." After thinking for a while, Michael concludes that these numbers are coordinates leading to the Lassen Volcanic Park in northeast California.

The next day, Nevins, equipped with a compass, a map, and a shovel, begins his search through the park. During his search, he realizes that the paths he takes are comparable to those of the game. After a long walk, he reaches the coordinates' exact location and begins digging until he finds the head of a girl with blonde hair in an advanced state of decomposition. After Nevins informs the authorities about the terrifying discovery, the girl is identified as Karel Paulsen, an 11-year-old girl who was reported missing by the San Diego Police Department a year and a half previously. After Michael's discovery, an investigation is carried out to find the identity of the programmer of the video game. However, the rest of Karen's body and the identity of the author of Pale Luna are never found. It is known that some collectors have offered great fortunes for the few copies of the video game.

Sonic.exe
Sonic.exe is a creepypasta initially created by JC -the- Hyena. The original story follows a teenager named Tom, who receives a CD from his friend Kyle and a note telling him to destroy it. Finding Kyle's warning to be a joke, Tom decides to play it, finding it to be a haunted version of Sonic the Hedgehog (1991). The haunted version of the game contains an eldritch entity known as X, who takes on a form almost identical to Sonic, with bloodstained, blackened sclera and glowing red pupils. In each of the three levels, Tom plays as Tails, Knuckles, and Doctor Eggman, only for them to be killed and enslaved by X at the end of them. After all the characters are killed, a "hyper-realistic" image of the character appears with the caption "I AM GOD". Tom turns around, only to see a stuffed Sonic toy crying blood on his bed, his fate unknown.

The original story was posted for the first time on the Creepypasta Wiki in August 2011 and was removed in January 2014 due to complaints of its poor quality when compared to other gaming creepypastas, despite it being somewhat influential. The growing backlash towards the story led its author to publish a protracted diatribe about his grievances with the Creepypasta Wiki's decision, which only fueled further criticism.

An unofficial edit of the Sonic the Hedgehog movie trailer was made to depict Sonic as X.

Toonstruck 2
Toonstruck 2 is a story revolving around the sequel to the video game Toonstruck, which was developed but not released due to the commercial flop of the first game. The protagonist of the story, an adventure game geek named Dave, buys a rare copy of the game from a creepy man in a black raincoat; as he plays Toonstruck 2, its atmosphere becomes increasingly sinister, and the game begins to change the real world around him (the original Toonstruck was about a cartoon animator transported to the toon world through TV). The story alleges that Toonstruck 2 was based on art from the sketchbook of a mentally ill cartoon animator who murdered his boss, bought by one of Virgin Interactive's executives at a murderabilia auction, and the real reason for its cancellation was that its contents were too shocking.

SVG's Christopher Gates wrote: "The incomplete storyline has proved to be fertile ground for fans, who seem more than happy to fill in the blanks... If Toonstruck had been finished, maybe it would've faded away. But it wasn't, and the mystery has kept Toonstruck fans engaged for over 20 years—and counting."

Analog horror 

Although not strictly fitting the definition of creepypasta, analog horror was built on many of the tropes pioneered by earlier creepypastas.

Local 58

Local 58 is a YouTube web series created by Kris Straub revolving around a news channel that is being constantly hijacked. The web series is notable for its effects to make it look like an actual television broadcast. Each episode revolves around a different scenario in which the news channel is being hijacked. For example, "Contingency" shows a hijacking where a foreign country had allegedly captured America and the broadcast tells the viewers to commit suicide via gunshot. The broadcast then concludes that "the 51st state is not a place" before the broadcast abruptly changes to a message apologizing for the 'hoax' that had been played on-air. Another entry in the series, "Weather Service", details through Emergency Alert System messages a seemingly-apocalyptic alien event involving the Moon or a force based on it 'infecting' those who gaze at the satellite. The video culminates in a person attempting to implore the audience not to look at the Moon, only to become 'infected' themselves after fighting with an entity instructing the audience to do the opposite, the final shot being that of the 'infected' human turning the camera feed to the full Moon while a large number of people can be heard screaming in terror in the background.

The Mandela Catalogue
The Mandela Catalogue is a YouTube analog horror series created by Alex Kister that takes place in the fictional Mandela County in Wisconsin, after it has suddenly become haunted by the 'Alternates', which can mimic people's voices and appearances and use psychological techniques to induce their victims to commit suicide. The series gained popularity in 2021 after a number of YouTubers posted videos covering it. As of December 2022, the series has 13 videos across 2 "acts". An indie game inspired by the series was created, titled Maple County.

Gemini Home Entertainment

Gemini Home Entertainment is a YouTube analog horror anthology series produced by Remy Abode. The series shows the contents of a set of VHS tapes produced by various entities and released by the eponymous Gemini Home Entertainment, a fictional media distributor. Over the course of the series, it becomes apparent that the material the tapes contain represent information about an ongoing extraterrestrial assault on the Solar System masterminded by 'The Iris', a sentient rogue planet, which has created numerous alien and paranormal entities to subjugate humanity and invade the Earth.

References

Creepypasta